A referendum on the military was held in Romania on 23 November 1986. Voters were asked whether they approved of reducing the size of the army and cutting military spending by 5%. According to official results, the proposals were approved by 100% of voters, with not a single vote against and only 228 registered voters not voting.

Background
Following a proposal by President Nicolae Ceaușescu, on 23 October 1986 the Great National Assembly changed the constitution to allow for referendums, whilst the voting age was lowered to 14 years.

On the same day, on the occasion of the International Year of Peace established by the United Nations, Law No. 20/1986 on the reduction of arms expenditures was promulgated, which provided for the holding of a confirmatory referendum on it.

The State Council presided over by Ceauşescu set the date of the referendum by Decree No. 360 of 5 November 1986.

Results
There were 16,073,845 registered voters for the referendum, of whom 16,073,621 went to the polls. The electoral body also included 1,577,357 young people between the ages of 14 and 18, of whom 1,577,353 voted.

Consequences 
As a result of the referendum, the Socialist Republic of Romania reduced the Armed Forces by 10,000 soldiers, 250 tanks and other armed vehicles, 130 guns and mine throwers, and 26 combat aircraft and helicopters, while military expenditures were cut by 1.35 billion lei. The human and financial resources saved were allocated to economic and social development programs. Military assets were redeployed, such as tanks were disarmed and used in agriculture and to enhance irrigation programs. Ceaușescu appealed to European states, the United States of America, and Canada to also unilaterally reduce armaments, troops, and military expenditures by 5%, in the belief that such a reduction would not compromise their defensive military capabilities, but would help facilitate dialogue for disarmament negotiations.

References

See also
International Year of Peace
1980s austerity policy in Romania

1986 referendums
1986 in Romania
Referendums in Romania
Military reform referendums
November 1986 events in Europe